Hana Hou! is an American bi-monthly English language inflight magazine.  It is published for Hawaiian Airlines by Honolulu-based NMG Network.

Hana Hou! (which means encore! in the Hawaiian language) includes feature stories, interviews, travelogues and profiles, and ‘Best of the Islands’  and ‘Native Intelligence’  sections.

The awards which the magazine has received  include two in 2007 from the Hawaiian chapter of the Society of Professional Journalists, and many more before and since.

Hana Hou! maintains extensive archives which include back issues going back as far as 2002 (Volume 5) on its website.  While complimentary copies are provided on all Hawaiian Airlines flights, the magazine is also marketed at newsstands in Hawaii and by subscription.

References

External links

Bimonthly magazines published in the United States
Hawaiian Airlines
Inflight magazines
Magazines established in 1998
Magazines published in Hawaii
Mass media in Honolulu
Tourism magazines